Division No. 4, Subd. B is an unorganized subdivision on St. George's Bay on the island of Newfoundland in Newfoundland and Labrador, Canada. It is in Division No. 4.
According to the 2016 Statistics Canada Census:
Population: 1174
% Change (2011 to 2016): -9.6%
Dwellings: 948
Area: 1847.38 km2
Density: 0.6 people/km2

Division No. 4, Subd. B includes the unincorporated communities of
 Cartyville
 Heatherton
 Highlands
 Jeffrey's
 Loch Leven
 McKay's
 Robinsons
 St. Fintan's
 St. David's

References

Newfoundland and Labrador subdivisions